Lawton is an unincorporated community in Tippecanoe Township, Pulaski County, in the U.S. state of Indiana.

History
A post office was established at Lawton in 1902, and remained in operation until it was discontinued in 1906.

Geography

References

Unincorporated communities in Pulaski County, Indiana
Unincorporated communities in Indiana